Baron Balfour of Glenawley or Clonawley, in the County of Fermanagh, was a title in the Peerage of Ireland. It was created in 1619 for Sir James Balfour, younger brother of Michael Balfour, 1st Lord Balfour of Burleigh. It refers to the barony of Clanawley (Scoticised to Glenawley).

Balfour was the second son of judge James Balfour, Lord Pittendreich. He and his elder brother were granted lands in Ireland during the Plantation of Ulster. Lord Balfour of Glenawley was the largest of the undertakers in County Fermanagh, where he built Castle Balfour in Lisnaskea.

Lord Balfour died in October 1634. He had two sons who survived him, but neither had heirs, and they died shortly after him. The title became extinct on the death of his younger son in 1636, however, it is possible he never succeeded to the title. According to The Complete Peerage, the succession of a third Baron Balfour of Glenawley has never been recognised in any peerage.

The lordship of Glenawley was revived in 1661 for Hugh Hamilton, 1st Baron of Glenawley, whose wife, Arabella Susan Balfour of Pitcullo, was also a relative, a daughter of a Sir William Balfour, and a nephew of Lord Balfour's daughter Anne.

Barons Balfour of Glenawley (1619)
James Balfour, 1st Baron Balfour of Glenawley (died 1634)
James Balfour, 2nd Baron Balfour of Glenawley (died 1635)
Alexander Balfour, 3rd Baron Balfour of Glenawley (died 1636), possibly never succeeded to the title

See also
Lord Balfour of Burleigh
Castle Balfour

References

Extinct baronies in the Peerage of Ireland
1619 establishments in Ireland
1636 disestablishments in Ireland
Baron Balfour of Glenawley
Noble titles created in 1619